The Gods Must Be Crazy II is a 1989 comedy film written and directed by Jamie Uys, and a sequel to the 1980 film The Gods Must Be Crazy, which Uys also wrote and directed. An international co-production between South Africa, Botswana and the United States, it was produced by the Weintraub Entertainment Group and released by 20th Century Fox on 13 October 1989. In the United States, it was released by Columbia Pictures on 13 April 1990.

Plot
The film has four storylines, which run in parallel and interact:
Xixo trying to find his lost children
Two elephant poachers travelling in a truck on which Xixo's children are stuck
A zoologist and a lawyer stranded in a desert
Two soldiers fighting each other

The story starts with two elephant poachers, the chronically mean "Big Ben" Brenner and his affable but not-very-bright assistant George, crossing the area in which Xixo's tribe lives. Curious about their vehicle, Xixo's son Xiri and daughter Xisa climb into the water tank trailer and are taken for an involuntary ride as the poachers continue. Xixo follows on foot, determined to retrieve his children.

Dr. Ann Taylor, a young lawyer from New York City, arrives at a bush resort to give a lecture at a legal conference. Since she has spare time, she accepts the invitation of a young man to take a joyride in a two-seat, twin engine ultralight aircraft. They go to see scientist Dr. Stephen Marshall, who has just been radioed that he must report to the resort where Dr. Taylor just came from to tend to a wounded animal they have found. Leaving the other pilot to watch his truck and equipment, he heads for the resort in the ultralight with Ann aboard, but encounter severe weather and crash, stranding them in the Kalahari desert. In addition, war is brewing, personified by a lost Cuban soldier (Mateo) and his Angolan enemy (Timi), who repeatedly attempt to take each other prisoner.

In the course of the movie, all these people cross paths with Xixo and/or his children. Finally, the plot culminates in the poachers capturing Xixo, Taylor, Marshall, and the two soldiers. Xixo manages to save them, and George, who is actually a nice guy kept under the heel of his boss, gives Xixo directions to his children. The poachers are captured, both soldiers come to somewhat reluctant terms and part without further violence, Taylor and Marshall return to civilization (though not without a last embarrassing accident), entering into a romantic relationship, and Xixo finds his children.

Cast
 N!xau as Xixo
 Eiros as Xiri
 Nadies as Xisa
 Hans Strydom as Dr. Stephen Marshall
 Lena Farugia as Dr. Ann Taylor
 Erick Raymond Bowen Alfaro as Mateo
 Treasure Tshabalala as Timi
 Pierre van Pletzen as George
 Lourens Swanepoel as "Big Ben" Brenner
 Dawid Kruiper as Oom Dawid

Reception 
The film received mixed reviews from critics. On Rotten Tomatoes, 54% of 13 critics' reviews are positive, with an average rating of 5.8 out of 10. Metacritic, which assigns a weighted average, gave the film a score of 51 out of 100 based on 17 reviews, meaning "mixed or average reviews".

References

External links
 
 
 
 

1988 films
American comedy films
South African comedy films
Botswana films
1988 comedy films
English-language South African films
Afrikaans-language films
Films set in Botswana
Films set in South Africa
Films shot in Botswana
Films about hunter-gatherers
Films directed by Jamie Uys
Films scored by Charles Fox
Columbia Pictures films
20th Century Fox films
Weintraub Entertainment Group films
American sequel films
South African sequel films
1989 comedy films
1989 films
1980s American films